Carlo Passerini (29 November 1793 Florence – 4 March 1857 Florence) was an Italian 
entomologist. He was Curator at the R. Natural History Museum in Florence.
His collection of Coleoptera is in the Paolo Savi Museum in Pisa (now the Natural History Museum of the University of Pisa).

References

Conci, C. 1975: Repertorio delle biografie e bibliografie degli scrittori e cultori italiani di entomologia.  Mem. Soc. Ent. Ital. 48 1969(4) 817-1069
Conci, C. & Poggi, R. 1996: Iconography of Italian Entomologists, with essential biographical data.  Mem. Soc. Ent. Ital. 75 159-382, Portrait.

Italian entomologists
1793 births
1857 deaths